Poia may refer to:

 Poia, Bihar, a village in Bihar, India
 Poia Lake, a lake in Montana, USA
 Poia, Trentino, a community in Lomaso, Trentino, Italy
 Mount Poia, a mountain in Pondera County, Montana, United States
 Poia, a community in Ponte di Legno, Val Camonica, Brescia, Lombardy, Italy
 Poia, a 1907 opera by American composer Arthur Nevin
 Poia, guitarist for Italian band Ufomammut

See also
 Poias, one of the Argonauts in Greek mythology